Burrs Mill may refer to:

Burrs Mill Brook
Burrs Mill, New Jersey

See also
Burr mill